Georgia Scorcher, or simply Scorcher, is a stand-up roller coaster located at Six Flags Over Georgia located in Austell, Georgia, United States. Manufactured by Bolliger & Mabillard, Georgia Scorcher opened on May 8, 1999, and was the last stand-up coaster installation ever built. The attraction was marketed with the tagline, "Put your feet to the fire."

History
Georgia Scorcher is the third attraction to occupy this location in the Georgia section of the park. It replaced the Ragin' Rivers "wet-dry" raft slide tower that was added for the 1991 season, which itself replaced one of the two Log Jamboree log flumes.

Unlike Mantis, Chang and The Riddler's Revenge, which opened at Cedar Point in 1996, Six Flags Kentucky Kingdom in 1997 and Six Flags Magic Mountain in 1998 respectively, Georgia Scorcher did not continue the trend of the world's tallest and fastest stand-up roller coasters. Its layout is more modest, in fitting with the long, narrow site selected for it.

On November 10, 1998, Six Flags Over Georgia announced that they would be building a new stand-up roller coaster. It would be named Georgia Scorcher and was scheduled to open for 1999 season.

Georgia Scorcher would open to guests in May 1999.

The track was originally painted yellow with purple supports. For the 2019 season, the track was repainted cherry red with dark grey supports.

Track layout
Georgia Scorcher departs the station and climbs its  lift hill. Then drops down a 101 ft drop. Then the roller coaster enters its  vertical loop. It then climbs to the right, circling back towards the station before diving sharply down to the left, entering a non-inverting inclined loop that threads through the center of the vertical loop. After exiting the element, the roller coaster then climbs a small hill and is twisted over on its right side, twisting back as it enters its second inversion, a corkscrew.

The roller coaster climbs up to the left, crossing over the start of the lift hill, before diving down and performing a ground-level 270-degree helix turn, crossing itself again as it rises one final time to enter the brake run, returning to the station via a U-turn to the left.

References

External links 

Roller coasters introduced in 1999
Roller coasters in Georgia (U.S. state)
Roller coasters operated by Six Flags
Six Flags Over Georgia
Stand-up roller coasters manufactured by Bolliger & Mabillard